The Invisible Eye is a 2010 international coproduction drama film directed by Diego Lerman. The film was screened at the Directors' Fortnight event of the 2010 Cannes Film Festival.

Cast 
 Julieta Zylberberg as María Teresa Cornejo
 Osmar Núñez as Señor Biasutto
 Marta Lubos as Adela

References

External links 

Argentine drama films
French drama films
Spanish drama films
2010 drama films
2010 films
2010s Argentine films
2010s French films